Oligyrtos is a mountain located at the junction of Arcadia, Corinthia and Argolis in the northeastern Peloponnese in Greece.  The mountain diagonally stretches from southwest to northeast, with about 35 km length and 15 to 20 km breadth. Its highest point is the peak Skipiza, at1,935 m elevation. Other peaks are Gkrimini (1,831 m), Parnias (1,800 m), Skiathis (1,777 m) and Mavrovouni (1,695 m). Neighboring mountain ranges are Kyllini (Ziria) to the north, Mainalo to the southwest, Trachy to the south and Chelmos (Aroania) to the northwest. Local flora consists mostly of grasslands and bushes. Pine trees and barren lands are found in higher areas. It is drained towards the Lake Stymphalia to the north, and towards the plain of Kandila to the south. In antiquity, the fortress Oligyrtus was located in a pass on the mountain.

Nearest places

 North: Lafka
 South: Skoteini and Kandila
 West: Limni and Mati

References

Landforms of Arcadia, Peloponnese
Landforms of Argolis
Landforms of Corinthia
Mountains of Greece
Mountains of Peloponnese (region)